Chante Temara (born 24 May 2001) is an Australian rugby league footballer who plays as a  for the Brisbane Broncos in the NRL Women's Premiership and the Burleigh Bears in the QRL Women's Premiership.

Background
Born in Rotorua, Temara emigrated to Australia with her family in 2007, where she played her junior rugby league for the Nerang Roosters on the Gold Coast, Queensland. She attended Keebra Park State High School.

Her older sister, Zahara, is an Australia and Queensland representative.

Playing career
In 2018, Temara made her debut for the Burleigh Bears as a 17-year old. In 2019, she represented Queensland under-18 in the inaugural Under-18 Women's State of Origin game.

In September 2020, she joined the Brisbane Broncos NRL Women's Premiership team. In Round 3 of the 2020 NRLW season, she made her debut for the Broncos in their 24–16 win over the Sydney Roosters. On 25 October 2020, she came off the bench in the Broncos 20–10 Grand Final win over the Roosters. Following the Grand Final, she was named in the Queensland State of Origin squad but did not play.

Achievements and accolades

Team
2020 NRLW Grand Final: Brisbane Broncos – Winners

References

External links
Brisbane Broncos profile

2001 births
Living people
New Zealand female rugby league players
Australian female rugby league players
Rugby league hookers
Brisbane Broncos (NRLW) players